Tạ Thanh Huyền (born May 3, 1994 in Thái Bình province, Vietnam) is a Vietnamese rower. She and Hồ Thị Lý placed 18th in the women's lightweight double sculls event at the 2016 Summer Olympics.

References

External links
 

1994 births
Living people
People from Thái Bình province
Vietnamese female rowers
Olympic rowers of Vietnam
Rowers at the 2016 Summer Olympics
Asian Games medalists in rowing
Rowers at the 2014 Asian Games
Rowers at the 2018 Asian Games
Asian Games gold medalists for Vietnam
Asian Games bronze medalists for Vietnam
Medalists at the 2014 Asian Games
Medalists at the 2018 Asian Games
Southeast Asian Games gold medalists for Vietnam
Southeast Asian Games medalists in rowing
Competitors at the 2015 Southeast Asian Games
21st-century Vietnamese women
20th-century Vietnamese women